Benthosphenus is an extinct genus of prehistoric amphibian (SHISHKIN & LOZOVSKY, 1979). Type specimen: PIN 3785/1. Its type locality is Russky Island, which is in a Smithian marine horizon in the Russian Federation. Age range: 251.3 to 247.2 Ma. Distribution: found only at Russky Island.

See also
 Prehistoric amphibian
 List of prehistoric amphibians

References 

Prehistoric amphibians